Russell John Dive (born 21 May 1966 in Wellington) is a New Zealand chess International Master (IM).

Chess career
Dive represented New Zealand in twelve Chess Olympiads between 1988 and 2018. His best result was in 1994 when he scored 7.5/11 and finished in 10th place for his individual board result.

Dive has won or jointly won the New Zealand Chess Championship seven times in 1986/87, 1995/96, 1998/99, 2015, 2018, 2019 and 2020. Dive has also won the New Zealand Rapid Chess Championship nine times in 1993, 1996, 1997, 2000, 2002, 2003, 2005, 2015 and 2022 and the New Zealand Correspondence Chess Championship twice in 1991 and 1993.

He won the London SCCU Open in 1995, scoring 7/9, and defeating GM Eduard Gufeld along the way.

Dive finished =2nd, with 6/9, in the 1999 Oceania Zonal Chess Championship, behind Vladimir Feldman. He also competed in the 2000 Oceania Zonal Chess Championship.

Dive has had a decades-long friendly rivalry with fellow IM and NZ Champion Anthony Ker, with an almost level score and high number of decisive games.

Notable games
 Ashot Anastasian vs Russell John Dive, 31st Chess Olympiad, Moscow 1994, Queen's Indian Defense, (E12), 0-1
 Russell John Dive vs Darryl K Johansen, Oceania Zonal Championship 1999, Benoni Defense, (A43), 1-0

References

External links

Russell John Dive chess games at 365Chess.com

1966 births
Living people
Chess International Masters
Chess Olympiad competitors
New Zealand chess players
People from Wellington City